Interference is a 1928 American drama film directed by Lothar Mendes and starring Clive Brook, William Powell, Evelyn Brent, and Doris Kenyon, all making their sound film debuts. In England when a first husband turns out not to be dead, blackmail leads to murder.

Plot
At a Remembrance Day service in London, Deborah Kane spots her old flame Philip Voaze who was supposedly killed during World War I. She discovers that he has actually survived the fighting and has been living under an assumed identity. Aware that his wife Faith is now remarried to Sir John Marlay, a famous heart surgeon, she tries to force Philip to return to her by threatening to reveal Faith's inadvertent bigamy. Philip eventually concludes that the only way to defend Faith's present happiness is to kill Deborah.

Cast
William Powell as Philip Voaze
Evelyn Brent as Deborah Kane
Clive Brook as Sir John Marlay
Doris Kenyon as Faith Marlay
Tom Ricketts as Charles Smith
Brandon Hurst as Inspector Haynes
Louis Payne as Childers
Wilfred Noy as Dr. Gray
Donald Stuart as Freddie
Clyde Cook  as Hearse Driver

Production
The film was originally produced as a silent which was directed by Lothar Mendes. However, after its completion, Paramount halted its release and decided to remake the film completely in sound. The sound version was directed by special effects technician-turned-director Roy J. Pomeroy, as the basis for Paramount Pictures' first feature-length all-talking motion picture. Since Pomeroy lacked experience as a director, he was assisted by William deMille during the filming. It was based on the 1927 West End play Interference by Roland Pertwee and Harold Dearden. It was shot on a budget of $250,000 A silent version was also released to cater for theaters that had not yet wired for sound. While the sound version survives, the silent version is now lost.

In 1935 it was remade by Paramount as Without Regret.

Critical reception
The film was praised in the New York Times as "a specimen of the strides made by the talking picture". However, a Variety review was more negative, describing Interference as "indifferent entertainment".

At the London premiere, Clive Brook's mother remembered a gaff during the screening that put the crowd in an uproar. In one scene, Brook receives a postcard, tears it up and says, "Another one of those damn postcards." The needle on the disk for sound got stuck and kept repeating, "Another one of those damn postcards," over and over again while Brook, on-screen, took his wife into his arms and kissed her.

References

Bibliography
 Bryant, Roger. William Powell: The Life and Films. McFarland, 2014.

External links

1928 films
American black-and-white films
American films based on plays
Films directed by Lothar Mendes
Transitional sound films
1920s crime drama films
Films set in England
1920s English-language films
Paramount Pictures films
American crime drama films
Films set in London
1928 drama films
1920s American films